Friends from France is a 2013 French drama film written and directed by Anne Weil and Philippe Kotlarski. It was screened in the Contemporary World Cinema section at the 2013 Toronto International Film Festival. The film is set in Odessa in 1979.

Cast
 Soko as Carole 
 Jérémie Lippmann as Jérôme
 Dmitry Brauer as KGB Agent
 Ania Bukstein as Vera
 Alexandre Chacon as David
 Alexander Senderovich as Nathan

References

External links
 

2013 films
2013 drama films
French drama films
2010s French-language films
Films set in 1979
2010s French films